David David may refer to:

 David David (fur trader) (1764–1824), Canadian fur trader, businessman, and militia officer
 David Mathayo David (born 1969), Member of Parliament in the National Assembly of Tanzania
 David David (surgeon) (born 1940), Australian surgeon
 David David-Weill (1871–1952), French-American banker and art collector

See also
 David & David, an American rock duo
 David Davis (disambiguation)
 David Davidson (disambiguation)